Dikkie Dik is a Dutch series of children's picture books, starring the eponymous red tomcat Dikkie Dik. The books are drawn by author Jet Boeke, and feature short, concise texts by Arthur van Norden. The series started in 1978 as part of the Dutch version of the children's TV show Sesame Street, but soon the stories appeared in book stores. 

On Sesame Street the stories were read aloud by Piet Hendriks, with recurring characters like Tommie, Pino or Troel listening. In the early 1980s the stories in Sesame Street were told by Rudy Kuhn, with some children as an audience, and in 1985 Frank Groothof took over.

In 2000 Boeke received the Kiekeboekprijs for her book Waar is Dikkie Dik?, as the best book for toddlers of the year.

Issues 

 1991 - Dikkie Dik gaat buiten spelen.
 1998 - Het blauwe blokboekje
 1998 - Het groene blokboekje
 1998 - Dikkie Dik Voorleesboek 2
 1998 - Dikkie Dik naar het strand
 1998 - Het rode blokboekje
 1999 - Het gele blokboekje
 1999 - Het geblokte blokboekje
 1999 - Het roze blokboekje
 1999 - Het witte blokboekje
 1999 - Het oranje blokboekje
 1999 - Het dikkerdandikke avonturenboek
 2000 - De ballon
 2001 - Dikkie Dik gaat in bad
 2003 - Dikkie Dik jarig!
 2004 - Dikkie Dik Kiekeboekje
 2005 - Het vier verhalen boek
 2005 - Dikkie Dik viert Sinterklaas
 2005 - Dikkie Dik viert Kerstmis
 2006 - Dikkie Dik telt voor tien
 2007 - Welterusten Dikkie Dik
 2008 - Het dikke verjaardagsboek
 2008 - Dikkie Dik knisperboekje
 2010 - Puzzelboek Dikkie Dik viert feest
 2011 - Het dubbeldikke voorleesboek van Dikkie Dik

Satire 
The theatershow Sex of the Dutch theater group De Vliegende Panters contains a persiflage on Dikkie Dik (in fact it's a parody of the narrator of Surinamese origin Rudy Kuhn, who read in the program Sesame Street from Dikkie Dik in the eighties), in which he stole a car radio and put a shot. The theatershow Sex was performed in 1996. At that time Rudy Kuhn hadn't been on Sesame Street for 10 years.

Dutch children's books
Books about cats
Characters in children's literature
Literary characters introduced in 1978